Sir Ian David Diamond  (born 14 March 1954) is a British statistician, academic, and administrator, who served as Principal and Vice-Chancellor of the University of Aberdeen until 2018. He became the UK's National Statistician in October 2019.

Early life and education
Diamond was born Kingskerswell, Devon, on 14 March 1954. He obtained a BSc degree in economics in 1975 and an MSc degree in statistics in 1976, both from the London School of Economics and Political Science (LSE). In 1981, he received a PhD degree in statistics from the University of St Andrews.

Academic and non-executive career 
Diamond became Principal of the University of Aberdeen in 2010, replacing Sir Duncan Rice. He announced in August 2017 that he would retire from this role, and was succeeded in the post by George Boyne in August 2018.

Diamond's previous appointments include Chief Executive of the Economic and Social Research Council, Chair of the Research Councils UK Executive Group, and Deputy Vice-Chancellor at the University of Southampton. Chair of Lloyds Banking Group Foundation for England and Wales, Visiting Fellow at Nuffield College, Oxford.

Diamond has been Chair of British Universities and Colleges Sport, Chair of the Department for International Development Research Advisory Group, 2018, Chair of Plan International UK, Chair of the Council for the Mathematical Sciences, and a Board Member of UK Research and Innovation, UK Statistics Authority, the Population Investigation Committee and Aberystwyth University. He stepped down as Chair of Edinburgh College of Further Education on his appointment as National Statistician.

Diamond was formerly a Trustee of the Iona Cathedral Trust, WWF UK, the National Centre for Social Research, UCAS and the British Academy and Chair of the Social Security Advisory Committee from 2018 to 2019.

His departure from the University of Aberdeen led to a pay-related controversy, where he was paid £282,000 over a supposed notice period where he was, in fact, no longer working for the university.

Government service 
Diamond has authored or co-authored seven books and government reports, contributed to a further 34, and authored over 100 academic papers. In 2016 he led a review of University finance in Wales which was commissioned by the Welsh Government, which recommended that grants towards tuition fees should be replaced with support for living costs instead.

Diamond's appointment as National Statistician, in succession to John Pullinger, was announced on 6 August 2019, and he took office on 22 October 2019.

Personal life 
Sir Ian Diamond is married to Jane Diamond. He is also a qualified football referee and cricket umpire.

Honours and awards

 1999: Elected to the UK Academy of Social Sciences (AcSS)
 2000: Clifford C. Clogg Award from the Population Association of America
 2005: Honorary Fellowship of Cardiff University
 2005: Fellow of the British Academy (FBA)
 2006: Honorary Degree of Doctor of Letters (DLitt) University of Glasgow
 2009: Fellow of the Royal Society of Edinburgh (FRSE)
 2012: Elected Burgess, City of Aberdeen
2013: Knight Bachelor, "for services to social science and higher education"
 2013: Commissioned as a deputy lieutenant (DL) of Aberdeen
 Honorary Degrees: Cardiff, Glasgow

References

Living people
Knights Bachelor
Deputy Lieutenants of Aberdeen
English statisticians
1954 births
Fellows of the British Academy
Fellows of the Royal Society of Edinburgh
Alumni of the London School of Economics
Alumni of the University of St Andrews
People from Teignbridge (district)
Fellows of the Academy of Social Sciences
Academics of the University of Southampton
Academics of the University of Aberdeen
Principals of the University of Aberdeen
Directors of the Office for National Statistics